Han Eom-ji (born November 10, 1998) is a South Korean professional basketball forward currently playing for the Incheon Shinhan Bank S-Birds of the Women's Korean Basketball League. She competed in the 2020 Summer Olympics.

References

External links
 Career statistics and player information from Women's Korean Basketball League
 

South Korean women's basketball players
South Korea national basketball team players
Olympic basketball players of South Korea
Basketball players at the 2020 Summer Olympics
People from Sacheon
1998 births
Living people
Sportspeople from South Gyeongsang Province